Danish Journal of Geography is a peer-reviewed scientific journal published by Taylor & Francis on behalf of the Royal Danish Geographical Society.

See also 
Fennia
Geografiska Annaler
Jökull
Norwegian Journal of Geography

References

External links 
 

Geography journals
Multilingual journals
Danish-language journals
English-language journals
Routledge academic journals
1926 establishments in Norway
Publications established in 1926
Academic journals associated with learned and professional societies
Biannual journals